Þórarinn Ingi Valdimarsson (anglicized Thorarinn Ingi Valdimarsson; born 23 April 1990) is an Icelandic footballer who plays for Stjarnan.

Club career
Þórarinn was born and raised in the town of Vestmannaeyjar, and got his debut for Íþróttabandalag Vestmannaeyja (ÍBV) in 2007 and played 12 games for the team in the 1. deild karla.

Þórarinn scored 2 goals in 19 games when ÍBV won promotion to Úrvalsdeild after winning the 2008 1. deild karla, and was named as the most promising player of the squad at the end of the season. The same year he played 5 games for the Iceland U19 national team. Þórarinn was on a one-month trial with Belgian team KV Mechelen in January 2009.

Þórarinn scored 1 goal in 19 matches in 2009 when ÍBV again were playing in the Icelandic top league, after five years of absence. The next season, he scored 5 goals in 21 matches when ÍBV finished third in the 2010 Úrvalsdeild. On 5 December 2010 he signed a new three-year contract with ÍBV. He was later selected for Iceland's first Futsal team.

Þórarinn started 21 matches and scored 5 goals in 2011, when ÍBV again finished third in the league. He also played four matches in the Icelandic Cup, scoring one goal. At the end of the season he was elected "young player of the year" by the players in Úrvalsdeild, joining famous players such as Guðni Bergsson, Rúnar Kristinsson and Eiður Guðjohnsen. The same year, Þórarinn played three matches for the under-21 team and was called up for the senior team at the end of the year, in a squad consisting of players from the Scandinavian leagues. In November 2011 he was on trials with English clubs Crewe Alexandra and Portsmouth.

He was in January 2012 offered a trial with Danish Superliga side Silkeborg IF. Þórarinn made his debut for the Icelandic national team when he started the friendly match against Japan in February 2012.

References

External links

1990 births
Living people
Thorarinn Ingi Valdimarsson
Thorarinn Ingi Valdimarsson
Thorarinn Ingi Valdimarsson
Thorarinn Ingi Valdimarsson
Thorarinn Ingi Valdimarsson
Sarpsborg 08 FF players
Eliteserien players
Thorarinn Ingi Valdimarsson
Thorarinn Ingi Valdimarsson
Expatriate footballers in Norway
Thorarinn Ingi Valdimarsson
Thorarinn Ingi Valdimarsson
Association football midfielders
Thorarinn Ingi Valdimarsson